Aventuras de Kirlian was a Spanish indie rock band in the 1980s. Although they experienced only moderate commercial success, they achieved a significant cult following in the Basque country, and their music has been a major influence on many Spanish bands of the 1990s. The band dissolved in 1989 and the members teamed up with drummer Gorka Ochoa to form a new group under the name of Le Mans.

Commencement
The core of the band was formed by Ibon Errazkin and Teresa Iturrioz, who began to jam together in the summer of 1985, both initially playing bass guitar. In February 1986, Jone Gabarain and Peru Izeta came on board and together they formed the group under the name Aventuras de Kirlian.

Line-up
 Jone Gabarain - vocals
 Teresa Iturrioz - bass
 Ibon Errazkin - guitar
 Peru Izeta - drums, guitar

Discography

Albums
 Aventuras de Kirlian (Dro, 1989)
 1986-1988 (Elefant, 2001)

Singles
 Víctor (Dro, 1989)
 Un día gris (Dro, 1989)

Spanish indie rock groups